The Nonsuch 33 is a Canadian sailboat, that was designed by Mark Ellis Design and first built in 1988.

The Nonsuch 33 is a development of the Nonsuch 30, which was the first design in the series of Nonsuch sailboats.

Production
The design was built by Hinterhoeller Yachts in Canada and a few have also been built by Wiggers Custom Yachts, who currently hold the molds. A total of 67 examples of the design have been completed.

Design
The Nonsuch 33 is a small recreational keelboat, built predominantly of fiberglass. It has a cat rig, an unstayed mast with a wishbone boom, a plumb stem, a vertical transom, an internally-mounted spade-type rudder controlled by a wheel and a fixed fin keel. It displaces  and carries  of ballast.

The boat is fitted with a Japanese Yanmar 3JH2T-BE diesel engine.

The design has a PHRF racing average handicap of 171 with a high of 171 and low of 168.

See also
List of sailing boat types

Similar sailboats
Abbott 33
Alajuela 33
Arco 33
C&C 33
Cape Dory 33
Cape Dory 330
CS 33
Endeavour 33
Hans Christian 33
Hunter 33
Hunter 33-2004
Hunter 33.5
Hunter 333
Hunter 336
Hunter 340
Marlow-Hunter 33
Mirage 33
Moorings 335
Tanzer 10
Viking 33
Watkins 33

References

Keelboats
1980s sailboat type designs
Sailing yachts
Sailboat type designs by Mark Ellis
Sailboat types built by Hinterhoeller Yachts
Sailboat types built by Wiggers Custom Yachts